Estelle Wettstein (born December 2, 1996) is a Swiss athlete in dressage and show-jumping. She competed at the 2018 World Equestrian Games and was the youngest rider during the 2019 FEI European Championships in Rotterdam.

Estelle represented her country on the Olympic Games in Tokyo, finishing 41st in the individual competition.

References

1996 births
Living people
Swiss female equestrians
Swiss dressage riders
People from Uster
Equestrians at the 2020 Summer Olympics
Olympic equestrians of Switzerland
Sportspeople from the canton of Zürich